Meråker is a municipality in Trøndelag county, Norway. It is part of the Stjørdalen region. Other villages in Meråker include Gudåa, Kopperå, and Stordalen.

The municipality markets itself as a recreational area. The main areas of employment are in industry and agriculture. The municipality is noted for its characteristic dialect.

The  municipality is the 80th largest by area out of the 356 municipalities in Norway. Meråker is the 260th most populous municipality in Norway with a population of 2,399.

General information
The municipality of Meråker was established on 1 January 1874 when the old municipality of Øvre Stjørdal was divided into two: Hegra (population: 3,409) in the east and Meråker (population: 1,861) in the west. The municipal borders have not changed since then.  On 1 January 2018, the municipality switched from the old Nord-Trøndelag county to the new Trøndelag county.

Name
The municipality (originally the parish) is named after the old Meråker farm (spelled "Mørakre" around 1430) since the first Meråker Church was built there.

Coat of arms
The coat of arms was granted on 28 September 1990. The official blazon is "Gules, a cart argent". This means the arms have a red field (background) and the charge is a mining cart. The mining cart has a tincture of argent which means it is commonly colored white, but if it is made out of metal, then silver is used. This design was chosen to symbolize the fact that mining has traditionally played a major role in the area and has been of great economic importance for Meråker. The municipal flag has the same design as the coat of arms.

Churches
The Church of Norway has one parish within the municipality of Meråker. It is part of the Stjørdal prosti (deanery) in the Diocese of Nidaros.

History

Meråker Smelter
In 1898, a carbide factory was opened at Kopperå, later this factor was rebuilt as a silicon smelter. The smelter was in operation until June 2006. Its main product was microsilica which is used as an additive to cement.

Geography
Meråker is a landlocked municipality in the central part of Trøndelag county. To the north is the municipality of Verdal, to the west is Stjørdal, to the south is Selbu and Tydal, and to the east is Sweden.

There are three major lakes in Meråker: Feren, Fjergen, and Funnsjøen. The river Stjørdalselva runs through the municipality towards the Trondheimsfjord. The river Rotla begins in the southern part of Meråker. The mountain Fongen sits on the southern border with Tydal and Selbu.

Government
All municipalities in Norway, including Meråker, are responsible for primary education (through 10th grade), outpatient health services, senior citizen services, unemployment and other social services, zoning, economic development, and municipal roads. The municipality is governed by a municipal council of elected representatives, which in turn elect a mayor.  The municipality falls under the Trøndelag District Court and the Frostating Court of Appeal.

Municipal council
The municipal council of Meråker is made up of 21 representatives that are elected to four year terms. The party breakdown of the council is as follows:

Mayors
The mayors of Meråker:

1874–1877: Christian Erlandsen
1878–1885: John Johnsen
1886–1887: Iver Lie
1888–1893: Fredrik Rø (V)
1894–1897: O. Hugdahl
1898–1907: Fredrik Rø (V)
1908–1910: Carl Olaf Iversen (H)
1911–1913: Olav Stubban (Ap)
1914–1916: Ole E. Wollan (Ap)
1917–1922: Peder J. Myrmo (Ap)
1923–1925: Arne Bergsaas (Ap)
1926–1937: Kristian Rothaug (Ap)
1938–1939: Joar Eimhjellen (Ap)
1939–1941: Alf Karlsen (Ap)
1942-1942: Arild Solberg (NS)
1943–1945: Alf Hembre (NS)
1945–1966: Alf Karlsen (Ap)
1967–1973: Johnny Stenberg (Ap)
1973-1995: Svein Brækken (Ap)
1995-2015: Bård Langsåvold (Ap)
2015-2019: Kari Anita Furunes (Sp)
2019–present: Kjersti Kjenes (LL)

Transportation
The Meråker Line railway follows the E14 through the municipality also, with stops at Kopperå Station, Meråker Station, and Gudå Station.

Media
The newspaper Meråkerposten has been published in Meråker since 1982.

Notable residents

 Anton Johnson Fridrichsen (1888 in Meråker – 1953) a Swedish theologian
 Helge Ingstad (1899 in Meråker - 2001) author, explorer and archeologist
 Arne Braa Saatvedt (1922 in Meråker – 1945) a Norwegian police official and member of the Nasjonal Samling, executed in 1945
 Bård Langsåvold (born 1952) a Norwegian politician, Mayor of Meråker 1995-2015
 Dag Lyseid (1954–2012) a footballer and politician, deputy Mayor of Meråker 1999-2008
 Vebjørn Selbekk (born 1969) a newspaper editor and author, brought up in Meråker

Sport 
 Magnar Lundemo (1938 in Meråker - 1987) a cross country skier and track and field athlete, competed at the 1960 and 1964 Winter Olympics
 Frode Estil (born 1972) a retired cross country skier, lives in Meråker
 Kine Beate Bjørnås (born 1980) a retired cross country skier
 Simen Raaen Sandmæl (born 1990 in Meråker) a Norwegian footballer with over 130 club caps

Media gallery

References

External links

 
Municipalities of Trøndelag
1874 establishments in Norway